Pultenaea involucrata is a species of flowering plant in the family Fabaceae and is endemic to the south-east of South Australia. It is a compact shrub with hairy branches, hairy egg-shaped to lance-shaped leaves, and yellow and red flowers.

Description
The lower surface and the edges of the leaves are covered with long, shaggy hairs.

Taxonomy and naming
Pultenaea involucrata was first formally described in 1864 by George Bentham in Flora Australiensis from specimens collected by Ferdinand von Mueller in the Mount Lofty Ranges. The specific epithet (involucrata) means having leaves or bracts around the base of the flowers.

Distribution
This pultenaea occurs in the south-east of South Australia.

References

involucrata
Flora of South Australia
Plants described in 1864
Taxa named by George Bentham